Joseph Blandisi (born July 18, 1994) is a Canadian professional ice hockey forward currently for the Toronto Marlies in the American Hockey League (AHL). He was drafted in the 6th round (162nd overall) by the Colorado Avalanche in the 2012 NHL Entry Draft.

Playing career

Junior
After playing in the Ontario Junior Hockey League with the Vaughan Vipers, Blandisi was selected in the 2011 OHL Priority Selection, 61st overall, by the Owen Sound Attack. Upon completing his rookie season with the Sound Attack in the Ontario Hockey League, Blandisi was drafted in the sixth round, 162nd overall, by the Colorado Avalanche in the 2012 NHL Entry Draft. In his sophomore season in 2012–13, Blandisi was traded by the Owen Sound Attack to the Ottawa 67's in exchange for Cody Ceci on January 7, 2013. Despite lacking in height, Blandisi possessed a solid frame and improved upon his rookie season with 51 points in 63 games.

Blandisi's tenure in Ottawa was limited to exactly a year, for in the 2013–14 season on January 8, 2014, he was dealt by the rebuilding 67's to the Barrie Colts. Limited to just 47 games again due to injury, Blandisi still improved to a point-per-game scoring rate. In the off-season, Blandisi was not offered a contract by the Colorado Avalanche and was re-entered into the 2014 NHL Entry Draft, in which he was passed over.

In preparation for the 2014–15 season, Blandisi attended the Buffalo Sabres training camp by invitation on September 13, 2014. At the conclusion of camp he was returned to the Colts without a contract. Amongst the leadership group with the Colts, Blandisi was later named captain on November 19. He broke out offensively in his overage season and was leading the club in scoring when he was signed to a three-year entry-level contract with the New Jersey Devils on January 14, 2015. He finished the season leading the OHL in goal scoring with 52 markers in 68 games and placing fourth in overall scoring with 112 points. Upon the club's second-round exit in the post-season, Blandisi was award the Leo Lalonde Memorial Trophy as the OHL's overage player of the year. He placed second in voting for the OHL's most outstanding player award, the Red Tilson Trophy, only to star phenomenon Connor McDavid.

Professional
After attending his first New Jersey Devils training camp, Blandisi was assigned to begin his professional career in the 2015–16 season with AHL affiliate, the Albany Devils on September 27, 2015. Blandisi made a quick transition to the pro level, maintaining a scoring presence on Albany's top line with 16 points in 18 games before he received his first recall to the NHL by the Devils on December 10, 2015. Centering a line between Kyle Palmieri and Jiří Tlustý, he made a successful NHL debut with the Devils in a 3–2 overtime victory against the Detroit Red Wings on December 11, 2015. He recorded his first NHL point, an assist, on a Lee Stempniak goal on January 12, 2016. On January 21, 2016, in a game against the Ottawa Senators, Blandisi netted his first NHL goal, and also had 2 assists as part of a 3-point first period that ended with a 5–0 Devils lead, their largest scoring output for a single period of the season.

Blandisi began the 2017–18 season, assigned to New Jersey's new AHL affiliate, the Binghamton Devils. He collected 14 points in 19 games before the Devils traded Blandisi on November 30, 2017 along with Adam Henrique and a third-round draft pick in 2018 to the Anaheim Ducks for Sami Vatanen and a conditional draft pick in 2019 or 2020.

In the 2018–19 season, Blandisi began with the San Diego Gulls of the AHL before he was called up to the Ducks to feature in 3 scoreless games. After his return to the Gulls, Blandisi registered 23 points in 27 games, before he was traded by the Ducks to the Pittsburgh Penguins in exchange for Derek Grant on January 16, 2019.

In the 2019–20 season, Blandisi played 21 games in the NHL with the Pittsburgh Penguins, registering 5 points (2 goals, 3 assists). On February 20, 2020 Blandisi was traded by the Penguins, along with Jake Lucchini to the Montreal Canadiens in exchange for Riley Barber and Phil Varone.

As an un-signed free agent leading into the 2021–22 season, on December 14, 2021, Blandisi signed a Professional Tryout contract with the Toronto Marlies of the AHL, the primary affiliate of the Toronto Maple Leafs.

Career statistics

Awards and honours

References

External links
 
AHL stats page

1994 births
Albany Devils players
Anaheim Ducks players
Barrie Colts players
Binghamton Devils players
Canadian sportspeople of Italian descent
Canadian ice hockey centres
Colorado Avalanche draft picks
Ice hockey people from Ontario
Laval Rocket players
Living people
New Jersey Devils players
Ottawa 67's players
Owen Sound Attack players
Pittsburgh Penguins players
Sportspeople from Markham, Ontario
San Diego Gulls (AHL) players
Toronto Marlies players
Wilkes-Barre/Scranton Penguins players